Pop's Props was an American aircraft manufacturer, founded by Scott Land in about 1994 and based in Cooksville, Illinois. The company specialized in the design and manufacture of ultralight aircraft in the form of plans and kits for amateur construction and operation under the US FAR 103 Ultralight Vehicles rules.

All the company's designs were of wood and fabric construction. The first was the Pop's Props Pinocchio, introduced in 1994. The Pinocchio is a single seat First World War fighter replica and three were flying by 1998. The Cloudster, a single seat parasol wing ultralight followed in 1995 and the Zing, a derivative of the Cloudster, in 1996.

Land became interested in selling the designs and closing the company early in the 21st century. In 2010 Jeff Erekson made an offer to buy the designs and the deal was completed in February 2011. Erekson formed Simplex Aeroplanes to sell the Cloudster and Zing aircraft.

Aircraft

References

Defunct aircraft manufacturers of the United States
Ultralight aircraft
Homebuilt aircraft